Wila Qullu (Aymara wila blood, blood-red, qullu mountain, "red mountain", also spelled Vilacollo) is a mountain east of the Barroso mountain range in the Andes of Peru which reaches a height of approximately . It is located in the Tacna Region, Tarata Province, Tarata District. Wila Qullu lies west of Warawarani and northwest of Wiqu.

References 

Mountains of Tacna Region
Mountains of Peru